The by-thirds 2015 Rotherham Metropolitan Borough Council election took place on Thursday 7 May 2015, to elect approximately one third of the members of the Rotherham Metropolitan Borough Council in England as part of the 2015 United Kingdom local elections held on the same day as the general election. All seats contested at this election were last contested in 2011, and of these, 20 were held by Labour Party councillors.

Following the premature resignation of former Cabinet member Cllr. Mahroof Hussain (L) elected in Boston Castle at a more recent election, his seat (for the Boston Castle ward) was also contested in the 2015 election.  As the election is held by thirds, a Labour Party majority would fall if the party failed to win more than 2 of the 22 seats that were up for election in 2015.

Council Composition
Prior to the election the composition of the council was:

After the election the composition of the council is:

C - Conservative PartyI  -  Independent

Summary 

The governing group of councillors, holding a majority of 16, remained councillors of the Labour Party, with two fewer members within this group (now standing at 48 councillors) and one fewer within the smaller local party opposition group of councillors (Conservatives) as these three seats fell to UKIP affiliated candidates, bringing the official opposition group to 13 councillors.  An Independent and a Conservative, who complete the Council Chamber, seek re-election in 2016.

Election result

Candidates in each ward

Results by Ward 
In these results an asterisk indicates incumbent in the Ward, and Bold names highlight winning candidate.

Anston and Woodsetts

Boston Castle

Brinsworth and Catcliffe

Dinnington

Hellaby

Holderness

Hoober

Keppel

Maltby

Rawmarsh

Rother Vale

Rotherham East

Rotherham West

Silverwood

Sitwell

Swinton

Valley

Wales

Wath

Wickersley

Wingfield

References

2015 English local elections
May 2015 events in the United Kingdom
2015
2010s in South Yorkshire